This is a list of geodesists, people who made notable contributions to geodesy, whether or not geodesy was their primary field. These include historical figures who laid the foundations for the field of geodesy.

Geodesists before 1900 (arranged by date) 

 Pythagoras 580–490 BC (ancient Greece)
 Eratosthenes 276–194 BC (ancient Greece)
 Hipparchus  190–120 BC (ancient Greece)
 Posidonius  135–51 BC (ancient Greece)
 Claudius Ptolemy  AD 83–168 Roman Empire (Roman Egypt)
 Al-Ma'mun 786–833 (Iraq/Mesopotamia)
 Abu Rayhan Biruni 973–1048 (Iran/Samanid Dynasty)
 Muhammad al-Idrisi 1100–1166 (Arabia/Sicily)
 Regiomontanus 1436–1476 (Germany/Austria)
 Abel Foullon 1513–1563 or 1565 (France)
 Pedro Nunes 1502–1578 (Portugal)
 Gerhard Mercator 1512–1594 (Belgium/Germany)
 Snellius (Willebrord Snel van Royen) 1580–1626 (Netherlands)
 Christiaan Huygens 1629–1695 (Netherlands)
 Pierre Bouguer 1698–1758 (France & Peru)
 Pierre de Maupertuis 1698–1759 (France)
 Alexis Clairaut 1713–1765 (France)
 Johann Heinrich Lambert 1728–1777 (France)
 Roger Joseph Boscovich 1711–1787 (Venetian Republic)
 Ino Tadataka 1745–1818 (Japan)
 Georg von Reichenbach 1771–1826 (Germany)
 Pierre-Simon Laplace 1749–1827 (France)
 Adrien-Marie Legendre 1752–1833 (France)
 Johann Georg von Soldner 1776–1833 (Germany)
 George Everest 1790–1866 (England/India)
 Friedrich Wilhelm Bessel 1784–1846 (Germany)
 Heinrich Christian Schumacher 1780–1850 (Germany/Russian Empire)
 Carl Friedrich Gauss 1777–1855 (Germany)
 Friedrich Georg Wilhelm Struve 1793–1864 (Russian Empire)
 Johann Jacob Baeyer 1794–1885 (Germany)
 George Biddell Airy 1801–1892 (England)
 Carl Christopher Georg Andræ 1812–1893 (Denmark)
 Karl Maximilian von Bauernfeind 1818–1894 (Germany)
 Wilhelm Jordan 1842–1899 (Germany)
 Hervé Faye 1814–1902 (France)
 George Gabriel Stokes 1819–1903 (England)
 Carlos Ibáñez e Ibáñez de Ibero 1825–1891 (Spain)
 Henri Poincaré 1854–1912 (France)
 Alexander Ross Clarke 1828–1914 (England)
 Charles Sanders Peirce 1839–1914 (United States)
 Friedrich Robert Helmert 1843–1917 (Germany)
 Heinrich Bruns 1848–1919 (Germany)
 Loránd Eötvös 1848–1919 (Hungary)
 Otto Hilgard Tittmann 1850–1938 (United States)

20th century geodesists (alphabetically arranged)

B
 Tadeusz Banachiewicz, 1882–1954 (Poland)
 Arne Bjerhammar, 1917–2011 (Sweden)
 Giovanni Boaga, 1902–1961 (Italy)
 Guy Bomford, 1899–1996 (England)
 William Bowie, 1872–1940 (United States)

C
 Éric Calais, 1964 (France)
 André-Louis Cholesky, 1875–1918 (France)
 Luís Cruls, 1848–1908 (Brazil)

F
 Irene Kaminka Fischer, 1907–2009 (United States)
 Buckminster Fuller, 1895–1983 (United States)

H
 John Fillmore Hayford, 1868–1925 (United States)
 Veikko Aleksanteri Heiskanen, 1895–1971 (Finland/United States)
 Reino Antero Hirvonen, 1908–1989 (Finland)
 Friedrich Hopfner, 1881–1949 (Austria)
 Martin Hotine, 1898–1968 (England)

J
 Harold Jeffreys, 1891–1989 (England)

K
 William M. Kaula, 1926–2000 (United States)
 Karl-Rudolf Koch 1935 (Germany)
 Feodosy Nikolaevich Krasovsky, 1878–1948 (Russian Empire/USSR)

M
 Mikhail Sergeevich Molodenskii, 1909–1991 (Russia)

O
 John A. O'Keefe, 1916–2000 (United States)

R
 Karl Ramsayer, 1911–1982 (Germany)

S
 Hellmut Schmid, 1914–1998 (Switzerland)

V
 Yrjö Väisälä, 1889–1971 (Finland)
 Petr Vaníček, 1935 (Canada)
 Felix Andries Vening-Meinesz, 1887–1966 (Netherlands)
 Thaddeus Vincenty, 1920–2002 (Poland)

W
 Alfred Wegener, 1880–1930 (Germany/Greenland)
 Hans-Georg Wenzel 1949–1999 (Germany)

See also 

Geodesy

References

Geophysicists
Geophysicists
Geodesists
Geophysicists
Geodesists